Gary Wynn Yohe is the  Huffington Foundation Professor of Economics and Environmental Studies at Wesleyan University, Middletown, Connecticut. He holds a PhD from Yale University.

Yohe specializes in Microeconomic theory, Natural Resources, and Environmental Economics. He is a researcher on the economics of climate change and integrated assessment modelling. Among other works, he is an editor of the book "Avoiding Dangerous Climate Change" and co-author (with Edwin Mansfield) of "Microeconomics| Microeconomics: Theory and Applications". He is a senior member of the United Nations Intergovernmental Panel on Climate Change (IPCC) that was awarded a share of the 2007 Nobel Peace Prize with Al Gore. He has been involved with the IPCC since the mid-1990s, has served, among other capacities, as a Lead Author for four different chapters in the IPCC Third Assessment Report, and as Convening Lead Author for the last chapter of the contribution of Working Group II to the IPCC Fourth Assessment Report. Yohe also worked with the Core Writing Team to prepare the overall Synthesis Report for the entire Assessment.

Yohe is also a member of the New York City Panel on Climate Change and the standing Committee on the Human Dimensions of Global Change of the National Academy of Sciences. He is also a standing member of the National Academy of Sciences' Committee on the Human Dimensions of Global Change.  He was a vice-chair of the Third National Climate Assessment.

He is one of the four co-signers of an open letter, dated March 12, 2010, regarding possible errors in the IPCC Fourth Assessment Report and regularly advises the US government.

References

External links
 
 Google Scholar

Energy economists
Environmental economists
Sustainability advocates
American economists
Intergovernmental Panel on Climate Change lead authors
Wesleyan University faculty
Yale University alumni
Living people
Year of birth missing (living people)
Ecology journal editors